The Iron and Steel Act 1967 was an Act of Parliament of the United Kingdom, which regulated corporate governance in the iron and steel industries. It required that employees had voting rights for the board of directors.

Contents
Schedule 4, Part V, stated that the corporation was required to participate in discussions with the workforce. Under this provision, worker directors were introduced in 1969.

See also
UK labour law 
UK company law

References
Labour Party, Industrial Democracy (1967) §92
E Ganguin, ‘B.S.C.’s worker directors take stock of their first year’ (25 June 1969) Financial Times
Bacot, ‘Blue Collars in the Boardroom’ (May 1972) Bus Ad 88
P Brannen, ‘Worker directors: an approach to analysis. The case of the British Steel Corporation’ in C Crouch and FA Heller, Organizational Democracy and Political Processes (Wiley 1983) vol I, ch 6

United Kingdom labour law
United Kingdom company law
United Kingdom Acts of Parliament 1967